The  was held at Denka Big Swan Stadium in Niigata. Organised by JAAF, the three-day competition took place from 1–3 October and served as the national championships in track and field for the Japan. The competition originally intended to serve as the qualifying trial for Japan at the 2020 Summer Olympics, but both the national championships and the Olympics were postponed due to the COVID-19 pandemic in Japan. The long-distance competitions were held separately from the main track and field competition, with 3000 metres steeplechase, 5000 metres and 10,000 metres all set to take place on 4 December at the Nagai Stadium.

Beyond the main track and field events, several other national championship events were contested separately that year. The marathon was staged on 8 March at the Lake Biwa Marathon (men) and Nagoya Marathon (women). Combined track and field events were held on 26–27 September at Nagano Athletic Stadium. The team relay championships were held between 16–18 October at the Nissan Stadium in Yokohama. Further events classed under the 104th edition of the national championships were scheduled for 2021, with indoor events on 6–7 February at the Osaka-jō Hall, 20 km walk on 21 February in Kobe and cross country running on 27 February in Fukuoka

Results

Men

Women

References

Results
Track and Field
Combined Events
Relays

External links
 Official website at JAAF

2020
Japan Outdoors
Athletics
Sport in Niigata Prefecture